1300 corporals is the name for the 1300 untrained officers that were sent as a reinforcement to the Serbian First Army at the Battle of Kolubara.

At the start of the war, many young men from both Serbia and Austria-Hungary left school and made themselves available to the High Command of the Serbian army. They were sent to the military school in Skopje. Even though their training wasn't yet completed, the development of the events forced the High Command to dispatch them to battle.

The Serbian army was in retreat, demoralized, in shortage of ammunition, Belgrade was in the enemy's hands, so the world already came to terms with the complete breakdown of Serbia. All available forces were needed for the crucial battle, which is why the corporal ranks were distributed to the youngsters in Skopje (hence the name), and were sent for Kolubara and Suvobor the next morning. There, the Serbian army, led by Živojin Mišić, pulled off one of the most important victories in World War I.

During 1916 and 1917, a group of around 500 corporals were in Jausiers, France, for a military training, from where they returned to the front.

1300 corporals symbolize a battle for freedom of their country and people, mainly because most of them were youngsters who went into the battle on their own initiative.

See also
Battle of Kolubara

References

Military history of Serbia